James Bradshaw (31 May 1793 – 4 March 1847) was a British Tory and later Conservative Party politician in the United Kingdom. He sat as Member of Parliament (MP) for Berwick-upon-Tweed from 1835 to 1837 and for Canterbury from 1837 to 1847.

Bradshaw was born 31 May 1793, the son of James Bradshaw and Harriet Fitzhugh. Following his father's death, his mother Harriet became Lady Harriet Peyton when she married Sir Henry Peyton, 2nd Baronet. In 1825, he married the actress Ann Maria Tree, they had one daughter. He died at his home in London on 4 March 1847 after a long and painful illness.

References

External links

1847 deaths
UK MPs 1835–1837
UK MPs 1837–1841
UK MPs 1841–1847
Tory MPs (pre-1834)
Conservative Party (UK) MPs for English constituencies
Place of birth missing
1793 births